Harry Clarke (15 September 1905 – 21 February 1989) was a leading Australian rules footballer of the 1920s and 1930s who played with South Melbourne in the Victorian Football League (VFL). 

The son of the curator at the Middle Park Lawn bowls club, Clarke was a wingman and won the Best and Fairest award for South Melbourne in their premiership season of 1933.

In addition to playing 147 games for South Melbourne Clarke also appeared 11 times for Victoria in interstate football.

In 2003 Clarke was named in the Swan's official 'Team of the Century'.

References

External links

1905 births
Australian rules footballers from Victoria (Australia)
Sydney Swans players
Sydney Swans Premiership players
Bob Skilton Medal winners
1989 deaths
One-time VFL/AFL Premiership players